The cuneiform sign for the syllable ab also represents that for ap, or the vowel and consonant usages of a, b, or p: in the Akkadian language "b" is unaspirated, formed with the lips, and "p" is aspirated, with the breath). In the Akkadian language "b" and "p" are interchangeable; also, in cuneiform texts, any vowel (a, e, i or u: there is no "o" in Akkadian) can be interchanged with any other. The ab/ap sign also has a corresponding capital letter (majuscule) usage as a sumerogram, as found in the Epic of Gilgamesh for AB, the Akkadian language for šību, meaning "elder".

In the corpus of the Amarna letters, where ab/ap is also commonly found, the names occur of the authors of letters to the Pharaoh, for example Labaya and Ayyab, in both of which the syllabic use of "ab is found.

The usage numbers for the "ab" cuneiform sign in Tablets I-XII of the Epic of Gilgamesh are as follows: ab - 11, ap - 28 and sumerogram AB - 12.

References 

Moran, William L. 1987, 1992. The Amarna Letters. Johns Hopkins University Press, 1987, 1992. 393 pages.(softcover)
 Parpola, 1971. The Standard Babylonian Epic of Gilgamesh, Parpola, Simo, Neo-Assyrian Text Corpus Project, c 1997, Tablet I thru Tablet XII, Index of Names, Sign List, and Glossary-(pp. 119–145), 165 pages.
Rainey, 1970. El Amarna Tablets, 359-379, Anson F. Rainey, (AOAT 8, Alter Orient Altes Testament 8, Kevelaer and Neukirchen -Vluyen), 1970, 107 pages.

Cuneiform signs